Blondi is an EP written and recorded by German electro-industrial musician Wumpscut.

Track listing
 "Rush (By :W:)" - 4:29	
 "Rush (By Dismantled)" - 5:18	
 "Rush (By Naked Beat)" - 5:30	
 "Rush (By Der Blutharsch)" - 3:17	
 "Don't Go (By :W:)" - 4:07	
 "Don't Go (Eighty 64C Short Cut by :W:)" - 4:13

References

2005 EPs
Wumpscut albums